Natalia Kaczmarek (born 17 January 1998) is a Polish athlete sprinter who specialises in the 400 metres. She won the silver medal in the event at the 2022 European Championships. Kaczmarek earned several global medals as part of 4 x 400 m relays, including gold in the mixed event and silver in the women's event at the 2020 Tokyo Olympics.

She was the 400 m 2019 European under-23 champion.

Career
Running in the heats as part of the women's 4 × 400 metres relays, Natalia Kaczmarek won the silver medal at the 2018 World Indoor Championships and a gold at the 2018 European Championships.

In the same relay event, she earned the bronze medal at the 2021 European Indoor Championships. In May, she took two gold medals at the European Team Championships, whose Super League events took place in Chorzów, Poland. Besides women's 4x400 metres relay victory she won the individual 400 metres event.

Kaczmarek won two medals at the delayed Tokyo Olympics in 2021, a gold with Poland's mixed 4x400 relay team (alongside Karol Zalewski, Justyna Święty-Ersetic and Kajetan Duszyński), and a silver as a member of women's 4×400m relay with Iga Baumgart-Witan, Małgorzata Hołub-Kowalik and Święty-Ersetic. Kaczmarek went out of the individual 400m event in the third semi-final in a time of 50.79 seconds.

In May 2022, she won 400m race at the Golden Spike meet in Ostrava, smashing her previous personal best with a time of 50.16 seconds, the second-fastest mark on the Polish all-time list.

On 6 August 2022, she improved her personal best to 49.86 seconds at the Kamila Skolimowska Memorial in Chorzów, becoming only the second Polish woman after Irena Szewińska to run 400 metres under 50 seconds.

On 15 February 2023, Kaczmarek became the first Polish woman to break the 51-second barrier in the indoor 400 m with a time of 50.90 seconds, finishing second behind only Femke Bol at the prestigious Meeting Hauts-de-France Pas-de-Calais in Liévin, France.

Achievements

International competitions

Personal bests
 100 metres – 11.73 (+1.8 m/s, Jelenia Góra 2022)
 200 metres – 23.31 (-0.7 m/s, Olsztyn 2022)
 200 metres indoor – 23.30 (Toruń 2023)
 400 metres – 49.86 (Chorzów 2022)
 400 metres indoor – 50.83 (Toruń 2023) 
Relays
 4 × 400 metres relay – 3:20.53 (Tokyo 2021) 
 4 × 400 metres relay indoor – 3:28.59 (Belgrade 2022)
 4 × 400 metres relay mixed – 3:09.87 (Tokyo 2021) European record

Notes

References

External links

 

1998 births
Living people
Polish female sprinters
Place of birth missing (living people)
World Athletics Indoor Championships medalists
Olympic athletes of Poland
Athletes (track and field) at the 2020 Summer Olympics
Olympic gold medalists for Poland
Olympic silver medalists for Poland
Medalists at the 2020 Summer Olympics
Olympic gold medalists in athletics (track and field)
Olympic silver medalists in athletics (track and field)
Olympic female sprinters
20th-century Polish women
21st-century Polish women
European Athletics Championships winners